Rotherham is a small village in the Hurunui District of the Canterbury region in New Zealand's South Island. It is between Culverden and Waiau on the Inland Kaikoura Road, on the northernmost part of the Amuri Plain. It lies near the south bank of the Waiau Uwha River, a popular location for trout and salmon fishing.

On 8 February 1886, a railway was opened to Culverden, but construction then stalled as debate raged about the final route and destination of the line. Some proposals included a line through Rotherham, and in 1914, work finally began on extending the line to Waiau via Rotherham. This extension was opened on 15 December 1919 and the line became known as the Waiau Branch.

Rotherham station had a relatively large station building by the standard of rural New Zealand stations, possibly due to plans that suggested terminating the line in Rotherham rather than in Waiau. The station also had stockyards and a goods shed; the stockyards were removed in 1970, and the goods shed was sold and relocated by July 1975.

The railway itself closed on 15 January 1978, with the station building left in its original location and acquired for use by a local farmer.

The Inland Kaikoura Road was formerly New Zealand State Highway 70; the state highway designation was revoked in 2004.

Demographics
Culverden is included in Amuri statistical area.

Rotherham had a population of 144 at the 2018 New Zealand census, an increase of 27 people (23.1%) since the 2013 census, and an increase of 42 people (41.2%) since the 2006 census. There were 54 households. There were 87 males and 57 females, giving a sex ratio of 1.53 males per female. The median age was 42.6 years (compared with 37.4 years nationally), with 33 people (22.9%) aged under 15 years, 21 (14.6%) aged 15 to 29, 63 (43.8%) aged 30 to 64, and 24 (16.7%) aged 65 or older.

Ethnicities were 93.8% European/Pākehā, 14.6% Māori, 2.1% Pacific peoples, and 6.2% Asian (totals add to more than 100% since people could identify with multiple ethnicities).

Although some people objected to giving their religion, 54.2% had no religion, 27.1% were Christian, 2.1% were Hindu and 2.1% had other religions.

Of those at least 15 years old, 15 (13.5%) people had a bachelor or higher degree, and 30 (27.0%) people had no formal qualifications. The median income was $30,600, compared with $31,800 nationally. The employment status of those at least 15 was that 54 (48.6%) people were employed full-time, 21 (18.9%) were part-time, and 3 (2.7%) were unemployed.

Education

References

Populated places in Canterbury, New Zealand
Hurunui District